Cambridge Elementary/Primary School may refer to:

Australia
Cambridge Primary School, Hoppers Crossing, Victoria
Cambridge Primary School, Cambridge, Tasmania

Canada
Cambridge Elementary School (Surrey, British Columbia)
Cambridge Public School, Ottawa, Ontario
Cambridge Public School, Embrun, Ontario

India
 Cambridge Public School, Kikkeri, Karnataka

United Kingdom
University of Cambridge Primary School
Cambridge Primary School, a school in Barrow-in-Furness

United States
Cambridge Elementary School, in the Mount Diablo Unified School District, Contra Costa County, California
Cambridge Elementary School, Vacaville, California
Cambridge Elementary School, Cocoa, Florida
Cambridge Elementary School, Kendall Park, New Jersey
Cambridge Elementary School, Jeffersonville, Vermont
Cambridge Public School and High School, Cambridge, Wisconsin

See also 
 Cambridge Public School District
 Cambridge School (disambiguation)
 Cambridge High School (disambiguation)